Harold Samuel Gordon "Jock" Ball (16 February 1912 – 3 June 1993) was a former Australian rules footballer who played with Melbourne in the Victorian Football League (VFL).

Ball won the Ovens and Murray Football League best and fairest award, the Morris Medal in 1934, when playing for Yarrawonga Football Club.

Notes

External links 

1912 births
Australian rules footballers from Victoria (Australia)
Melbourne Football Club players
Yarrawonga Football Club players
1993 deaths